Mohammed Makhlouf (October 19, 1932September12, 2020) was a Syrian businessman and the uncle of President Bashar al-Assad.

Career
Mohammed was the brother of Anisa Makhlouf, who married Hafez al-Assad in 1957. He initially worked for Syrian Air. Since his son-in-law became president, he made a fortune both by managing government companies and in the private sector, including becoming general manager of the state-owned tobacco company as well as charging foreign companies a 10% commission on imported tobacco. In 1985, he became director of the Real Estate Bank of Syria (REB). He also became a partner in the "Al Furat Petroleum" company, whose shares were distributed among the Syrian government (65%), and the rest was owned by foreign companies, including Shell plc. His company obtained services related to oil fields from the Lead Contracting & Trading Company, which was owned by his son-in-law, Ghassan Muhanna. When Bashar al-Assad became president, his son Rami inherited his business empire.

In August 2011, he became subject to European Union sanctions, including travel bans and asset freezes, among individuals with close ties to the Syrian regime during the Syrian Civil War. He later appealed to the European General Court (EGC), claiming that the sanctions had violated his privacy and affected his standard of living, but the Council rejected his appeal.

In 2015, a leaked document from his HSBC bank account revealed that he had registered as an agent for Philip Morris, which owns the Marlboro brand, and as an exclusive agent for Mitsubishi Motors and Coca-Cola.

Personal life
Makhlouf was married twice. He had seven children with his first wife, Ghada Adeeb Muhanna, including: Rami, Hafez, Iyad, Ihab, Shala, Kinda, and Sarah. Then, he married Hala Tarif Al-Maghout during his stay in Russia, and had one son, Ahmed.

On September 12, 2020, he died at Al Assad University Hospital in Damascus, due to complications from COVID-19.

References

1932 births
2020 deaths
20th-century Syrian businesspeople
21st-century Syrian businesspeople
Assad family
Deaths from the COVID-19 pandemic in Syria
People from Latakia Governorate
People of the Syrian civil war
Sanctioned due to Syrian civil war
Syrian individuals subject to the European Union sanctions
Syrian individuals subject to U.S. Department of the Treasury sanctions